Nawab Syed Ghulam Muhammad Ali Khan I Bahadur Mansur-Ud-Daullah  (died 1825) was twice Nawab of Banganapalle in India.

The first time was between 1783 and 1784, as Jagirdar. His second reign was from 1789 to 1820. His time saw many significant changes in the history of Banganapalle, most significant being the recovery through marriage of the Jagir of Chenchelimala.

Biography
He was eldest son of Sayyid Husain Ali Khan Bahadur.

He succeeded on the death of his father as Jagirdar of Banganapalle, 26 August 1783. He reigned under the guardianship of his paternal uncle between 1783 and 1784.

Fled with him to Hyderabad when Hyder Ali invaded and overran Banganapalle, 1784. Entered the Nizam's service and appointed to a mansab of high rank, losing the fingers of his right hand in battle against the Marathas. Recovered the jagir after his uncle defeated Tipu's forces under Muhammad Yusuf and Kutb ud-din at Tammadapalle before 21 September 1789, but preferred to reside in Hyderabad with his family.

Later he was granted the jagir of Chenchelimala by his paternal uncle and father-in-law as marriage gift. Finally, he was abdicated in favour of his eldest son, before 8 September 1822.

He married on 31 August 1791, Najib un-nisa Begum Sahiba, only daughter of Nawab Sayyid Asad Ali Khan Bahadur, Jagirdar of Chenchelimala.

He died at Hyderabad, 4 June 1825 and was buried at Banganapalle.

See also
Nawab of Carnatic
Nawab of Masulipatam
Nawab of Banganapalle

References

History of Andhra Pradesh
1825 deaths
Nawabs of India
Year of birth missing
Mughal Empire